Jagajyoti Malla (Newar Script: Devanagari Script:जगज्योति मल्ल) (died 1637)  was a Malla Dynasty King of Bhaktapur, Nepal from 1613 to 1637. Unlike many of the other Malla rulers, there is little evidence today that this king was particularly active in construction developments in Nepal.

References

Malla rulers of Bhaktapur
1637 deaths
Year of birth unknown
17th-century Nepalese people